"Good Guy" is a song by American rapper Eminem from his tenth studio album Kamikaze, released on August 31, 2018 via Shady Records. Recording sessions took place at Effigy Studios in Detroit. Produced by Illadaproducer with additional production by Em, it features guest vocals by Canadian singer Jessie Reyez and a looped vocal sample through the song from "Glassy Sky" (Tokyo Ghoul) by Yutaka Yamada. Despite never being released as a single, the song has managed to chart in several countries. On December 7, 2018, the accompanying music video was released.

Music video
The music video for the song was released on December 7, 2018. The video features a violent altercation between the two artists, resulting in Reyez killing Eminem.

Personnel
Marshall Mathers – main artist, vocals, additional producer, mixing, songwriter
Jessie Reyez – featured artist, vocals, songwriter
Ray Fraser – producer, songwriter
Luis Resto – additional keyboards
Mike Strange – recording, mixing
Joe Strange – recording
Tony Campana – recording

Charts

Certifications

References

2018 songs
Eminem songs
Jessie Reyez songs
Songs written by Eminem
Songs written by Jessie Reyez
Song recordings produced by Eminem